Birkha Bahadur Muringla (13 April 1943 – 8 June 2022) was one of the eminent writers in Limbu literature from Sikkim, British Raj, now India. He was awarded the Padma Shri by the Government of India in 2017 for his contribution to Limbu language and literature.

References

1943 births
2022 deaths
Indian writers
Limbu people
Writers from Sikkim
Recipients of the Padma Shri in literature & education